Within the medical field of otology, the Stenvers projection is a radiological technique named after the physician Hendrik Willem Stenvers (1889–1973) of Utrecht. It provides an oblique view of the skull and establishes a better perspective on the petrous bone, bony labyrinth, and internal auditory canal. It focuses on the posteroanterior and lateral planes.

References

Radiology
Otology